William Crompton may refer to:

 William Crompton (politician) (1811–1886), New Zealand politician
 William Crompton (inventor) (1806–1891), loom technology inventor

See also
Bill Crawford-Crompton
William Compton (disambiguation)